John Constandinou (born 16 July 1972) is an athlete who competes internationally for Cyprus in the event of racewalking.

He holds the Cyprus National Records for both the 50 km and 20km walks. *  He is also a former ski racer, competing in both Giant Slalom and Downhill, and a member of Birchfield Harriers athletics club.

He was editor of the international magazine Race Walking Record from 2009 to 2013.

 Note: A faster Cyprus 20 km walk record exists - the "all-time" record - dating from before Cyprus became a country.

Personal bests

References

1972 births
Living people
Cypriot racewalkers
British magazine editors